Black Cherry are a British/French electro pop band. The band was formed in London in 2007 by singer/songwriter Megane Quashie, drummer/producer Guilhem Fraisse and guitarist Robert Moore. After performing at Glastonbury 2008 on The Other Stage as well as many other festivals that year, Black Cherry release their first EP 'This is Control' in the beginning of 2009 and embarked on an American Tour. After playing a number of festivals including Hungary's Balaton Sounds the band lost guitarist Robert Moore after he died. The band's second EP "The Preface" was dedicated to his memory.

After playing at Glastonbury Festival again in 2010, festival organiser Michael Eavis called Black Cherry "The best looking band at the festival". In 2011, they played at South by Southwest Festival and toured America. In Summer, the band announced the release of their double A-Side "One Another"/"Lost in the System" on 29 August to be distributed by Island/Def Jam Records and received positive reviews in The Guardian Newspaper. The band are currently working on a full-length album.

Members
 Megane Quashie – lead vocals, guitar, synths
 Guilhem Fraisse – drums

Additional touring members
 Kay Watson – synths, backing vocals
 Jamie McDonald – guitar, backing vocals

Discography

EPs

Advertising
 'Modern Lover' off their forthcoming album White Gold was used in a J.C. Penney advertising campaign.
 'One Another' off their forthcoming album White Gold was used in a Brown Thomas advertising campaign.

References

English synth-pop groups
Musical groups established in 2007
2007 establishments in England
Musical groups from London